Salies-du-Salat (literally Salies of the Salat) is a commune in the Haute-Garonne department in southwestern France.

Population

Economy
Salies-du-Salat is known for its therapeutic hot springs. The spa buildings, recently renovated, form the attractive centrepiece to the town.

There is a small casino located in the town. A weekly market takes place on Mondays in the centre of town.

See also
Communes of the Haute-Garonne department

References

Communes of Haute-Garonne
Comminges